Pentwater Lake is a water body adjacent to the village of Pentwater, Michigan. Its primary inlet is the Pentwater River; its outlet is a man-made channel flowing into Lake Michigan.

Pentwater Lake has a surface area of 431 acres, a maximum depth of 50 feet, and an average depth of 27 feet. The lake contains 11,590 acre-feet—a volume of water that would cover 18 square miles to a depth of one foot. Its shoreline is 6.2 miles long.

See also
List of lakes in Michigan

References

External links
Pentwater Lake Guidebook Pentwater Lake Improvement Board

Lakes of Michigan
Tributaries of Lake Michigan